Anton Oleksandrovych Sytnykov (born 12 July 1991) is a professional Ukrainian football goalkeeper who plays for Livyi Bereh Kyiv.

Career
Sytnykov was one of four new players signed by FC Lviv during March 2010 in an effort to achieve promotion to the Ukrainian Premier League. Manager Algimantas Liubinskas believed Sytnykov would challenge for a spot in the first team, and he made his debut against FC Nyva Ternopil on 20 March 2010.

References

External links
 
 
 Interview with Sytnykov

1991 births
Living people
Ukrainian footballers
Association football goalkeepers
FC CSKA Kyiv players
NK Veres Rivne players
FC Lviv players
FC Zirka Kropyvnytskyi players
FC Hirnyk-Sport Horishni Plavni players
FC Obolon-Brovar Kyiv players
FC Inhulets Petrove players
MFC Mykolaiv players
MFC Mykolaiv-2 players
FC Livyi Bereh Kyiv players
Ukrainian First League players
Ukrainian Second League players
Ukraine youth international footballers